Openlands is a non-profit conservation organization and accredited land trust that works with groups and individuals in northeastern Illinois, northwestern Indiana, and southeastern Wisconsin to preserve open space, develop walking and biking trails, restore natural areas, and connect people to the outdoors. Openlands has protected and expanded public access to more than 55,000 acres of land for parks, forest preserves, land and water greenway corridors, and urban gardens across the Chicago metropolitan region. 
It is a member of Chicago Wilderness.

History 
The organization was founded in 1963 as the Openlands Project, a project of the Welfare Council of Metropolitan Chicago.  

MacArthur Foundation has been a large supporter of Openlands. Between 1984 and 2018, MacArthur awarded $4,808,360 in grants to the organization.

Projects 
In 1970, the Lake Michigan Federation, now the Alliance for the Great Lakes, was founded as a project of Openlands before becoming an independent organization.  

In 1980, Friends of the Chicago River was established as a program of Openlands before becoming a separate non-profit organization. In 1982 the Canal Corridor Association was formed by Openlands to create the first National Heritage Corridor along the old Illinois and Michigan Canal.   

In 1991, Openlands launched TreeKeepers, a program that trains and certifies volunteers to care for trees on some public property in the Chicago region. Program trainers include tree experts, arborist, and Openlands staff. TreeKeepers is part of Openland's Urban Forestry Program which has received $1.5 million from MacArthur Foundation since 2013 to increase the Chicago region's tree canopy and expand community outreach and engagement. Since the program launched, the organization has trained more than 2,000 volunteers. More than 5,000 trees have been planted in Chicago by volunteers of the program since 2013. 

The Openlands Lakeshore Preserve in Fort Sheridan opened to the public in 2011. It encompasses 77 acres of ravines and bluffs along a mile of the shore of Lake Michigan. 

In 2012 Hackmatack National Wildlife Refuge was established by the U.S. Fish and Wildlife Service after seven years of advocacy by Openlands and partners. Hackmatack was the first national wildlife refuge in the Chicago region and will eventually consist of 11,200 acres of protected wildlife habitat.

In 2018 Conserve Lake County (serving Lake County, IL) merged into Openlands.

References 

Nature conservation organizations based in the United States
Ecological restoration